The Mercedes-Benz M256 engine is a turbocharged straight-six engine produced since 2017, when it was first introduced on the W222 S450. It replaces the previous M276 V6 engine, and is Mercedes' first straight-six engine since the M104 engine.

Design 
It uses an aluminium alloy block with dual overhead camshafts and has 4 valves per cylinder. The M256 uses a 48V electrical system to operate a BorgWarner electric supercharger, which can spin up to 70,000 rpm to reduce turbo lag.

Models 
Engine output excluding the additional 48V system boost available on the S500:

M256 E30 DEH LA GR 
 2017–2020 W222 S 450 / S 450 4MATIC (European models only)
 2018–present C257 CLS 450 / CLS 450 4MATIC
 2019–present X290 AMG GT 43 / GT 43 4MATIC+
 2019–present X290 AMG GT 50 / GT 50 4MATIC+ (China only)
 2019–present V167 GLE 450 4MATIC
 2019–present X167 GLS 450 4MATIC
 2019–present Austro Daimler Bergmeister PHEV
 2020–present W213 E 450 4MATIC
 2021–present W223 S 450 4MATIC
 2021–present W223 S 580 e 4MATIC

M256 E30 DEH LA G 
 2017–2020 W222 S 500
 2018–present W213 E 53 4MATIC+
 2018–present C257 CLS 53 4MATIC+
 2018–present X290 AMG GT 53 4MATIC+
 2020–present V167 GLE 53 4MATIC
 2021–present W223 S 500 4MATIC
 2021–present Aston Martin DBX Straight-Six

References

External links 
 Press release

Mercedes-Benz engines
Straight-six engines
Gasoline engines by model